The Energy Act 2010 is an Act of the Parliament of the United Kingdom pertaining to the regulation of energy usage and markets, with amendments to similar pieces of previous legislation. The Act was granted Royal Assent on 8 April 2010 along with a series of other bills during the wash-up period prior to the 2010 general election.

History

House of Commons
Introduced by Ed Miliband MP, the then-Secretary of State for Energy and Climate Change, the Energy Bill had its first reading on 19 November 2009. On 7 December of the same year, the Bill received its second reading and first debate, during which the Labour Party and the Liberal Democrats agreed on the continuation of the Energy Bill to become law, while facing opposition from the Conservative Party. While Miliband received questions over grid access, gas storage, and the Government's support of the European "super-grid," the Bill was passed to the committee stage.

Legislation
The Energy Act 2010 is subdivided into four parts: carbon capture storage and regulation, schemes for reducing fuel poverty, regulations of gas and electricity markets, and final provisions. Each of these parts contains a number of sections and clauses, with a total of 39 sections throughout the act.

Carbon capture energy and storage
Part one of the Act details the powers of the Secretary of State for Energy and Climate Change to provide funding for carbon capture and storage (CCS) projects, at the same time being allowed to withhold or cease funding CCS demonstrations. There are also provisions for the Secretary of State to impose a "supply levy" upon those who use supplies of electricity. Further, section five requires that the Secretary of State provide a report every three years on the state of both decarbonising electricity and the development of new carbon capturing technologies.

References

United Kingdom Acts of Parliament 2010
Energy in the United Kingdom
Environmental law in the United Kingdom
2010 in British law
2010 in the environment
Energy law